Camponotus palpatus is a species of insect of the genus Camponotus, belonging to the family Formicidae, which was described by Carlo Emery in 1897.

References 

Insects described in 1897
palpatus
Taxa named by Carlo Emery